The Women's Voluntary Service Medal was instituted in 1961 to reward fifteen years of exemplary service in the Women's Voluntary Service. In 1966 Queen Elizabeth II granted the organisation the prefix "Royal" in recognition of its valued work and the title of the medal was changed to Women's Royal Voluntary Service Medal.

Royal Voluntary Service
The Women’s Voluntary Services for Air Raid Precautions was established in 1938, in anticipation of impending hostilities. They played a key role on the home front during the Second World War, most notably during the Blitz, including in the evacuation of civilians from urban areas. After the war, the organisation evolved to assisting and caring for isolated and lonely people, particularly the elderly. Renamed the Royal Voluntary Service in 2013, it still serves as back-up to professional services in times of crisis by running rest centres and providing emergency feeding to members of the public, fire and rescue crews and police.

Institution
The Women's Voluntary Service Medal was instituted on 23 March 1961. It was renamed the Women's Royal Voluntary Service Medal when Queen Elizabeth II, patron of the Women's Voluntary Service since 1956, granted the organisation the prefix "Royal" in 1966. Although the organisation was further renamed the Royal Voluntary Service in 2013, dropping 'women' from the title, the name of the medal did not change.

Award criteria
The medal can be awarded to a volunteer after completing forty duties each year over a period of fifteen years. Service in the Civil Defence, disbanded in 1968, could count towards the award, provided the period had not been reflected in the award of the Civil Defence Long Service Medal.
Holders of the medal qualify for the award of a clasp after each subsequent period of twelve years service.  

By 2015, approximately 35,000 medals had been awarded. This includes a number of awards to men, the first in 1964.

Order of wear
In the order of wear prescribed by the British Central Chancery of the Orders of Knighthood, the Women's Royal Voluntary Service Medal takes precedence after the Voluntary Medical Service Medal and before the South African Medal for War Services.

Description
The medal was struck in cupro-nickel by the Royal Mint and is a disk,  in diameter, with a raised rim on each side and suspended from a straight non-swivelling bar. The medal's design was created by coin designer Norman Sillman ARCA FRBS. It is awarded unnamed.

Obverse
The obverse has the letters "WVS", superimposed one upon the other in sequence and encircled by a wreath of ivy, the symbol of steadfastness, and rosebuds.

Reverse
The reverse shows three flower stems of rosemary, the woman’s herb, to typify remembrance and friendship. It is circumscribed "SERVICE BEYOND SELF".

Clasp
The clasp was also struck in cupro-nickel and is inscribed "LONG SERVICE". It is rectangular with bend-over pins on the reverse for attachment to the ribbon.

Ribbon	

References

Long and Meritorious Service Medals of Britain and the Commonwealth